Wacousta is a novel by John Richardson. It was first published in December 1832 by Thomas Cadell in London and William Blackwood in Edinburgh. Wacousta is sometimes claimed as the first Canadian novel, although in fact it is preceded by Julia Catherine Beckwith's St. Ursula's Convent; or, The Nun of Canada (Kingston, 1824). Wacousta is better categorized as the first attempt by a Canadian-born author at historical fiction.

However, it is one of the first novels written by a Canadian-born author about Canada, and, in spite of its overwrought sentimentalism, it has been treated as a seminal work in the development of a Canadian literary sensibility.

Its themes include prophecy and opposites, such as manliness vs. effeminacy, wilderness/wildness vs. civilization, sensibility vs. compassion and the natural vs. the supernatural among others.

In the period of publication, Wacousta was quite popular not only in Canada, but also in the United States.  A contemporary novel it competed with was James Fenimore Cooper's The Last of the Mohicans.  Where they differ is that Cooper's novel focuses on the efforts of the individual within the whole, but Richardson's novel concerns itself with broader cross-cultural motivations.
Canadian critic Joseph Pivato has pointed out that the image of the British settlers huddled together inside the fort inspired Northrop Frye to propose his "garrison mentality" theory for Canadian literature.

References

Works cited
 
 Frye, Northrop. The Bush Garden: Essays on the Canadian Imagination (1971)

External links

1832 novels
Canadian historical novels
New Canadian Library
19th-century Canadian novels